Joe Klocek (born 24 June 1995) is an Australian actor. He is known for his roles in the television series Nowhere Boys, as well as his roles in the film The Dry. In 2017, Klocek had a guest role as Evan Lewis in the Australian soap opera Neighbours. He rejoined the cast as Byron Stone in 2022.

Klocek has appeared in the TV shows Barracuda, Please Like Me, Neighbours, Glitch, Harrow, Life of Jess and Patricia Moore. He has also appeared in the films Pirates of the Caribbean: Dead Men Tell No Tales and Children of the Corn.

Filmography

Film

Television

References

External links
 

1995 births
Living people
Australian male film actors
Australian male television actors
Male actors from Brisbane